Moving Day is a 1936 American animated short film produced by Walt Disney Productions and released by United Artists. The cartoon, set during the contemporary Great Depression, follows the antics of Mickey Mouse, Donald Duck, and Goofy as they frantically pack their belongings after being dispossessed from their home. The film was directed by Ben Sharpsteen and includes the voices of Walt Disney as Mickey, Clarence Nash as Donald, Pinto Colvig as Goofy, and Billy Bletcher as Sheriff Pete. It was the 85th Mickey Mouse short to be released, and the eighth of that year.

Plot
Mickey and Donald are six months overdue on their rent payments for their home. Sheriff Pete bangs on the front door and punches Mickey in the face when he goes to answer. Pete gives them a "Notice to Dispossess" authorizing him not only to evict them, but to sell off their belongings as collateral. He furiously strikes a match on Donald's beak to light his cigar, and then throws it into his mouth. Donald coughs out the match and yells at Pete as he leaves to put out signs advertising cheap furniture.

As Donald and Mickey decide to move before Pete can sell all their belongings, Goofy, employed as an iceman, arrives with a delivery. Mickey and Donald decide to have him help them with the relocation and for the use of his truck.

While Mickey struggles with an overloaded suitcase, Goofy attempts to load an upright piano onto the truck, but the piano keeps rolling out of the truck when he leaves it unattended or when he does not notice it. Goofy eventually discovers the piano to have a mind of its own after it runs over him like a car and battles it around the house. Meanwhile, Donald, in his haste to pack everything he sees, grabs a gas heater which is attached to a gas line in the wall. Seeing the leaking gas, he casually plugs it with a plunger, but the pressure in the line shoots the plunger out and it sticks to Donald's buttocks. He struggles to remove the plunger but squeezes it so hard it flies upward like an aeroplane propeller and cuts through a lamp, making Donald hang from the wall and then once again get stuck in a fish tank.

As Donald struggles with the tank, Goofy learns that he can control it if just his hat is visible to the piano. However, after Goofy taunts the piano, it rolls out of the truck off-screen, smashes through the door, and strikes him in the back again, which catapults him into the icebox where he ends up eating a watermelon. Donald finally frees himself from the fish tank, only to get catapulted across the room and gets his head stuck on the gas valve, which makes his body fill up with air like a balloon, and get launched and flies around the room, knocking over dishes and throwing Mickey and Goofy's clothes everywhere. Outside, Pete hears the commotion and storms into the room to scold the trio for the mess and orders them to sit down and listen immediately. Unaware of the gas leak, he strikes another match on Donald's beak, but the heat caused by the leaking gas causes his match to destroy the house and somehow catapult all the furniture and items, Mickey, Donald, and Goofy into the truck and they quickly drive away in search for a new home. Pete ends up in a bathtub in the remains of the devastated house, and as he tries to get the trio to return, he accidentally turns the hot water on, leading to another humiliating defeat for him. Donald is satisfied with his victory and laughs, but the toilet plunger once again lands on his tail, causing him to lose his temper again while trying to remove it from his feathers.

Voice cast
Walt Disney as Mickey Mouse
Clarence Nash as Donald Duck
Pinto Colvig as Goofy
Billy Bletcher as Pete

Releases
1936 – original theatrical release
1955 – Disneyland, episode #2.12: "The Goofy Success Story" (TV)
c. 1960 – "Walt Disney Character Films" (8mm)
1972 – The Mouse Factory, episode #8: "Men at Work" (TV)
c. 1983 – Good Morning, Mickey!, episode #21 (TV)
c. 1992 – Donald's Quack Attack, episode #16 (TV)
1997 – The Ink and Paint Club, episode #26 "Classic Donald" (TV)

Home media
The short was released on December 4, 2001 on Walt Disney Treasures: Mickey Mouse in Living Color.

Additional releases include:
1986 – "Mickey Knows Best" (VHS)
2005 – "Classic Cartoon Favorites: Starring Mickey" (DVD)

See also
Mickey Mouse (film series)

References

External links

Moving Day at the Big Cartoon Database
Moving Day at The Encyclopedia of Animated Disney Shorts at the Disney Film Project

1936 films
1930s color films
1936 animated films
1930s Disney animated short films
Films set in the 1930s
Great Depression films
Mickey Mouse short films
Films directed by Ben Sharpsteen
Films produced by Walt Disney
American black-and-white films
1930s American films